Elaine L. Graham  (born 1959) is the Grosvenor Research Professor at the University of Chester. She was until October 2009 the Samuel Ferguson Professor of Social and Pastoral Theology at the University of Manchester. In March 2014, she was installed as Canon Theologian of Chester Cathedral.

Education
Elaine Graham holds a BSc (Social Science) (Hons) in Sociology and Economic and Social History (1980) from the University of Bristol, a MA in Social and Pastoral Theology from the University of Manchester (1988) and a PhD entitled "The Implications of Theories of Gender for Christian Pastoral Practice and Theological Formulation" (1993), also from Manchester.

Career
After working as the Northern Regional Secretary of the Student Christian Movement (1981–84) and four years as ecumenical lay chaplain at Sheffield City Polytechnic (now Sheffield Hallam University), Elaine Graham joined the University of Manchester in 1988 as a lecturer in Social and Pastoral Theology.  She was appointed to the position of Samuel Ferguson Professor of Social and Pastoral Theology, succeeding Ronald Preston (1970–81) and Tony Dyson (1981–98) in June 1998. She later held the position of Head of the School of Religions and Theology & Middle Eastern Studies from 2000 to 2004.

Elaine Graham was the President of the International Academy of Practical Theology from 2005 to 2007 and was a member of the Archbishops' Commission on Urban Life and Faith, which published the report Faithful Cities: A call for celebration, vision and justice (Methodist Publishing House, 2006).

In 2009 she moved to the Department of Theology and Religious Studies at the University of Chester as Grosvenor Research Professor in Practical Theology. In 2014 she was installed as the Canon Theologian of Chester Cathedral in a lay capacity.

She was elected a Fellow of the British Academy in 2021.

Published works

Books
This is a list of books that Graham has published or edited.

Articles and chapters
In addition, she has also written a number of articles in edited volumes and academic journals.

Other information

University of Chester Staff Page: [www.chester.ac.uk/departments/trs/staff/graham]
Publications on Chester Repository (open access):

References

External links
 Commission on Urban Life and Faith

1959 births
Living people
British theologians
Public theologians
Academics of the University of Chester
Academics of the University of Manchester
Alumni of the University of Bristol
Alumni of the University of Manchester
People associated with Sheffield Hallam University
Practical theologians
Fellows of the British Academy